The Pickman House is a first period structure located on Charter Street in Salem, Massachusetts, behind the Peabody Essex Museum. As no published dendrochronology study has been done, the exact build date of this home is disputed. In either case the house is thought to have stood during the Salem witch trials of 1692 and 1693. The house is now part of a group of properties that form the Charter Street Historic District. It has been described by the Massachusetts Historical Commission as a rare surviving example of 17th century architecture.

History
Samuel Pickman was a mariner who acquired land to build his house in 1657. When he chose to build the house is now disputed among three different dates by sources. An early date of 1671, which was obtained through an unpublished dendrochronology study was taken by architectural conservator Steven Mallory. The Peabody Essex Museum which features Mallory's interview though states that the house dates to 1665. The third and latest proposed date is 1680, as assessed by the Massachusetts Historical Society in 1979. In any case, Pickman's estate inventory mentioned a house on his tract by May 9, 1687. 

In addition to its age, the home is also notable for having residences over the subsequent years which include; Judge and Chief Justice of the Massachusetts Bay Colony Benjamin Lynde, Jr., and artist Michele Felice Corne. The Pickman House at one time had a Victorian era roof which concealed the 17th century structure. These 17th century features were not discovered until 1968 as part of a commission to study the house. Architectural historian Abbott Lowell Cummings stated that the "room at the left with leanto roof at right angles may have existed at the outset, and was later raised to a full two stories about 1725." During this time a new chimney was added, and the one-story porch with embellished posts dates to around c. 1800. 

The Pickman House was eventually restored by Historic Salem in 1969 and was operated as a house museum in the 1970s. Exhibits included 17th century paraphernalia with historical animatronic mannequins in every room which were push button activated. The layout of the museum involved both floors which consisted of three bedrooms, a kitchen, and an attic that had been converted into the curator’s quarters. While there was no mention of a bathroom or living room area, the museum included a red barn beside the house which operated as a gift shop. In 1983 the Peabody Essex Museum purchased the house and the museum was later closed to make way for corporate offices. The Pickman house presently abuts the Salem Witch Memorial, which was dedicated in 1992 on the 300th anniversary of the Salem witch trials. In 2021 the home was re-opened to the public again as a welcome center for the charter street cemetery.

Gallery

See also
 National Register of Historic Places listings in Salem, Massachusetts
 List of the oldest buildings in Massachusetts
 List of historic houses in Massachusetts
 List of the oldest buildings in the United States

References

External links

Peabody Essex Museum
Salem Preservation

Houses completed in the 17th century
Historic districts in Essex County, Massachusetts
Peabody Essex Museum
Houses in Salem, Massachusetts
Colonial architecture in Massachusetts